Audra Smith (born January 23, 1970) is a head women's basketball coach .

Career
Smith played basketball at the University of Virginia, graduating with a degree in sociology in 1992.  Beginning in 1994, she served as an assistant coach for the Cavaliers for 10 seasons.

In the 2004–05 season, Smith became head coach at the University of Alabama Birmingham. She coached UAB for eight seasons. During the 2006 season, UAB went 19–13, including a 12–4 Conference USA mark, as UAB set records for most Conference USA wins in a season. UAB was selected to the Women's National Invitation Tournament (WNIT) tournament that year, reaching the second round. In the 2005 season, she posted a 14–14 record and a 7–9 CUSA record.

On April 8, 2013, Smith was announced as the head coach of the Clemson Tigers, where she remained until 2018.

On June 7, 2018, Smith was announced as the next head coach of South Carolina State.

Head Coaching Record

*  Fired before the end of the season

References

1970 births
Living people
American women's basketball coaches
Clemson Tigers women's basketball coaches
Place of birth missing (living people)
UAB Blazers women's basketball coaches
Virginia Cavaliers women's basketball coaches
Virginia Cavaliers women's basketball players
South Carolina State Lady Bulldogs basketball coaches